The O'Brien Observatory (OBO) is an astronomical observatory in the city of Marine on St. Croix, Minnesota, United States, about  northeast of Minneapolis.  The observatory is owned and operated by the University of Minnesota and opened in 1968.  It has one telescope, a  Cassegrain reflector capable of observing at both optical and infrared wavelengths.  It is used for primarily for instruction and instrument testing, and occasionally for research purposes.

See also
 Mount Lemmon Observatory
 List of astronomical observatories

References

External links
 Department of Astronomy Infrared Laboratory at the University of Minnesota
 Lee & Rose Warner Nature Center Clear Sky Chart Forecasts of observing conditions approximately 4.5 km west of OBO.

1968 establishments in Minnesota
Astronomical observatories in Minnesota
Buildings and structures in Washington County, Minnesota
University of Minnesota